Celaru is a commune in Dolj County, Oltenia, Romania with a population of 4,593 people. It is composed of five villages: Celaru, Ghizdăvești, Marotinu de Jos, Marotinu de Sus and Soreni.

References

Communes in Dolj County
Localities in Oltenia